The Journal of Advanced Academics is a quarterly  peer-reviewed academic journal covering the field of gifted education, including broader issues in the education of academically advanced learners, such as advanced placement and international baccalaureate programming, academically focused charter and magnet schools, and honors programming in the college or university setting. The editors-in-chief are Todd Kettler (Baylor University) and Anne N. Rinn (University of North Texas). The journal was established in 1989 and is published by SAGE Publications.

Abstracting and indexing 
The journal is abstracted and indexed in:
 Academic Search Complete
 Academic Search Premier
 Education Research Complete
 PsycINFO
 Zetoc

External links
 

Publications established in 1989
Special education journals
Quarterly journals
English-language journals
SAGE Publishing academic journals